Elephant Rock can refer to:

Landmarks
 Elephant Rocks (Antarctica), a rock formation in the Palmer Archipelago, Antarctica
 Elephant Rocks (Western Australia), a beach in Australia
 Elephant Rock, a rock formation near Hopewell Cape, New Brunswick, Canada
 Elephant Rock (Iceland), a volcanic rock in the Iceland Sea
 Elephant's Rock, a large boulder and archaeological site in Sardinia, Italy
 Elephant Rocks (New Zealand), a rock formation near Duntroon, New Zealand
 A rock formation in Nasca Province, Peru
 Jabal Al-Fil (Elephant Mountain), a sandstone outcrop, Al-'Ula, Saudi Arabia
 Ethagala (The Elephant Rock), a rock that overlooks the town of Kurunegala, Sri Lanka
 Elephant Rock, Hartlepool, a former rock formation in Hartlepool, England, UK
 The original name of Eagle Rock in the Santa Monica Mountains, California, US
 An alternative name for Egg Rock in Nahant Bay, Massachusetts, US
 Elephant Rocks State Park, in Missouri, US
 Elephant Rock (Wheatland County, Montana), a mountain in Wheatland County, Montana, US
 A stone landmark in Kings Canyon, Utah, US

Inhabited places
 Anekal ('Elephant Rock' in Kannada), Bangalore Urban district, Karnataka, India
 Batu Gajah ('Elephant Rock' in Malay), Kinta District, Perak, Malaysia

Other uses
 Elephant Rock Books, a major, independent publisher based in Connecticut, USA
 Elephant Rock Ride, an annual cycling event in Castle Rock, Colorado, USA
 "Elephant Rock", a track on the Upsetters 14 Dub Blackboard Jungle album